The Chicago City Council assumed its modern form on April 16, 1923, with fifty wards each electing one alderman. Here is a list of the people who have served as an alderman since that time.

Since its incorporation as a city in 1837 Chicago had been divided into wards whose number varied but which were almost always entitled to two aldermen. In the early 20th century it was decided that reducing the number of aldermen to a ward to one would be a cost-saving measure, and an ordinance to that effect was passed in 1920, taking effect in 1923.

Aldermanic elections in Chicago have been formally nonpartisan since 1920. Nevertheless, many aldermen have had, and continue to have, de facto partisan affiliations that are reflected in this list.

This list is organized by which side of the Chicago River the wards were on as of 1923. Numbering the wards such that those on the South Side received the first numbers, followed by in order the West and North sides was a tradition that had dated to the City's founding and division into wards in 1837. Incumbent aldermen who started a new term in 1923 are reckoned as having started their term in 1923 regardless of whenever they actually started holding office, which is noted in the "Notes" column.

History
Chicago was incorporated in 1837 and initially comprised six wards.

South Side (Wards 1–19)

1st Ward
Originally covering the Loop, Near South Side, and the northern part of Armour Square, this ward was significantly moved to its current location in 1993 to help stymie corruption.

2nd Ward
Originally covering Douglas and its immediate surroundings, this ward has drastically moved northward to its current location across the Near North Side and West Town.

3rd Ward

4th Ward

5th Ward
Charles S. Eaton (Republican)
Leonard J. Grossman
Charles S. Eaton (Republican)
Irving J. Schreiber 
James J. Cusack Jr. (Democratic)
Paul H. Douglas 
Bertram B. Moss 
Robert E. Merriam
Leon Despres
Ross Lathrop 
Lawrence Bloom 
Barbara Holt
Leslie Hairston

6th Ward
Guy Guernsey 
John F. Healy (Democratic)
Patrick Sheridan Smith 
Francis J. Hogan 
David R. Muir 
Sydney A. Jones Jr. 
Robert H. Miller 
A. A. Rayner Jr.
Eugene Sawyer
John O. Steele
Freddrenna Lyle
Roderick Sawyer

7th Ward
Ross A. Woodhull 
Clement A. Nance 
Barnet Hodes 
Thomas J. Daley (Democratic)
Nicholas J. Bohling (Republican)
Robert S. Wilinski 
Gerald E. Jones 
Robert S. Wilinski 
Joseph G. Bertrand 
William Beavers
Darcel Beavers
Sandi Jackson
Natashia Holmes
Gregory Mitchell

8th Ward
William D. Meyering (Democratic)
David L. Sutton (Democratic)
Michael F. Mulcahy 
Roy E. Olin 
Einar Johnson 
James A. Condon
William Cousins Jr.
Marian Humes 
Keith Caldwell 
Lorraine L. Dixon 
Todd Stroger
Michelle A. Harris

9th Ward
Sheldon M. Govier 
Arthur G. Lindell (Republican)
Reginald DuBois 
Dominic J. Lupo 
Alexander A. Adduci 
Robert Shaw 
Perry H. Hutchinson 
Robert Shaw 
Anthony Beale

10th Ward
Ernest M. Cross (Republican)
William A. Rowan (Democratic)
William J. Pieczynski 
Emil V. Pacini
John J. Buchanan
Edward Vrdolyak
Victor Vrdolyak 
John J. Buchanan
John Pope
Susie Sadlowski Garza

11th Ward
Timothy A. Hogan 
John P. Wilson 
Thomas A. Doyle (Democratic)
Hugh B. Connelly 
John F. Wall 
Stanley J. Nowakowski
Matthew J. Danaher 
Michael Anthony Bilandic
Patrick M. Huels
James Balcer
Patrick Daley Thompson
Nicole Lee (politician)

12th Ward
Ernest J. Kunstmann (Republican)
Bryan Hartnett (Democratic)
Benjamin J. Zintak 
Bryan Hartnett
Edmund J. Kucharski
Arthur V. Zelezinski
Donald T. Swinarski
George A. Kwak
Aloysius Majerczyk
Mark J. Fary
Ray Frias
George Cardenas

13th Ward
Joseph B. McDonough
Thomas A. Doyle
John E. Egan (Democratic)
Michael P. Hogan
John E. Egan
David W. Healy
Casamir J. Staszcuk
John S. Madrzyk
Frank Olivo
Marty Quinn

14th Ward

15th Ward
Thomas F. Byrne
James F. Kovarik (Democratic)
Edward F. Vyzral
Frank Micek
Joseph J. Krska
Francis X. Lawlor
Kenneth B. Jaksy
Frank J. Brady
Marlene C. Carter
Virgil E. Jones
Theodore Thomas
Toni Foulkes
Raymond Lopez

16th Ward
Terence Moran (Democratic)
John S. Boyle 
Paul M. Sheridan Sr.
Paul M. Sheridan Jr.
Anna Langford
Eloise Barden
Anna Langford
Shirley Coleman
JoAnn Thompson
Toni Foulkes
Stephanie Coleman (2019–present)

17th Ward
John H. Lyle (Republican)
Robert E. Barbee
James G. Coyle
Frank J. Corr (Democratic)
William T. Murphy
Arthur A. Slight
Charles Chew
William H. Shannon
Tyrone McFolling
Allan Streeter
Terry Peterson
Latasha Thomas
David H. Moore

18th Ward
Patrick F. Ryan
Walter W. Morris
Harry E. Perry (Democratic)
Bernard J. O'Hallaren
Thomas J. Corcoran 
Frank J. McGrath
James C. Murray
Edward J. Hines
Robert T. Kellam
Thomas W. Murphy
Lona Lane
Derrick Curtis

19th Ward

West Side (Wards 20–41)

20th Ward
Henry L. Fick
A.J. Prignano 
William V. Pacelli (Republican)
Anthony Pistilli 
Kenneth E. Campbell 
Clifford P. Kelley 
Ernest Jones
Arenda Troutman
Willie Cochran
Jeanette Taylor

21st Ward
Dennis A. Horan
John J. Lagodney (Democratic)
Joseph F. Ropa
Charles S. Bonk
Samuel Yaksic
Wilson Frost, Democratic
Bennett Stewart, Democratic
Niles Sherman
Jesse J. Evans
Leonard DeVille
Howard Brookins Jr.

22nd Ward
Joseph Cepak
Henry Sonnenschein (Democratic)
Otto F. Janousek
Frank D. Stemberk
Jesús "Chuy" García
Ricardo Muñoz
Michael D. Rodriguez

23rd Ward
Joseph O. Kostner
John Toman (Democratic)
Joseph Kacena Jr.
George J. Tourek
Frank J. Kuta
Joseph Potempa
Bill Lipinski
William F. Krystyniak
James Laski
Michael R. Zalewski
Silvana Tabares

24th Ward
Jacob Arvey (Democratic)
Fred Fischman
Louis London
Sidney D. Deutsch
Benjamin F. Lewis
George W. Collins
David Rhodes
Walter Shumpert
William C. Henry
Jesse L. Miller Jr.
Michael Chandler
Sharon Denise Dixon
Michael Chandler
Michael Scott Jr.

25th Ward

26th Ward

27th Ward

28th Ward
George M. Maypole
George D. Kells (Democratic)
Patrick P. Petrone
Anthony G. Girolami
Alphonse Tomaso
Angelo C. Provenzano
Joseph Jambrone
Jimmy L. Washington
William Carothers
Ed Smith
Jason Ervin

29th Ward
Albert J. Horan
Thomas J. Terrell (Democratic)
Joseph S. Gillespie
George R. Pigott
Thomas F. Burke
Robert Biggs
Leroy Cross
Danny K. Davis
Sam Burrell 
Isaac Carothers
Deborah L. Graham
Chris Taliaferro

30th Ward
John S. Clark Jr. (Democratic)
Edward J. Upton
Edmund J. Hughes
Daniel J. Ronan
Edwin H. McMahon
Elmer R. Filippini
George A. Hagopian
George J. Hagopian
Carole Bialczak
Michael Wojcik
Ariel Reboyras

31st Ward

32nd Ward

33rd Ward
Joseph Petlak
George M. Rozczynialski
Joseph P. Rostenkowski
Zefiryn H. Kadow (Democratic)
Vincent S. Zwiefka
John B. Brandt
Robert Brandt
Rex Sande
Richard Mell
Deb Mell
Rossana Rodriguez-Sanchez (2019–present)

34th Ward
Edward J. Kaindl
Thomas Patrick Keane (Democratic)
Matt Porten (Democratic)
Herbert F. Geisler
Rex Sande
Wilson Frost
Lemuel Austin Jr.
Carrie Austin

35th Ward
George Seif (Democratic)
Matt Porten
Walter J. Orlikoski (Democratic)
Frank Peska
Casimir C. Laskowski
John C. Marcin
Joseph S. Kotlarz Jr.
Michael A. Wojcik
Vilma Colom
Rey Colón
Carlos Ramirez-Rosa

36th Ward
A.C. Sievers (Republican)
Eugene L. Nusser 
George W. Robinson (Democratic)
Richard M. Walsh 
Louis P. Garippo
Frank Ringa 
Alfred J. Cilella
Robert L. Massey
John F. Aiello
Louis Farina
William Banks
John Rice
Nicholas Sposato
Gilbert Villegas

37th Ward
Wiley W. Mills (Democratic)
James H. Taylor
Wiley W. Mills
Roger J. Kiley (Democratic)
Francis E. Callahan
William J. Lancaster
Paul T. Corcoran
Thomas J. Casey
Frank A. Damato
Percy Z. Giles
Emma Mitts

38th Ward

39th Ward
Frank J. Tomczak (Democratic)
Frank R. Ringa
Walter J. Orlikoski
James H. Hurley (Democratic)
Hyman L. Brody
Ray N. Jacobs
George L. Buckley
Phillip A. Shapiro
Anthony C. Laurino
Margaret Laurino
Samantha Nugent

40th Ward
Christ A. Jensen (Democratic)
John William Chapman
Joseph C. Ross (Republican)
Samuel Gurman
Benjamin M. Becker
Seymour Simon
Nathan J. Kaplan
Seymour Simon
Solomon Gutstein
Ivan Rittenberg
Patrick J. O'Connor
Andre Vasquez (2019–present)

41st Ward
Thomas J. Bowler (Democratic)
James C. Moreland (Republican)
William J. Cowhey
Joseph P. Immel Jr.
Harry Bell
Edward T. Scholl
Roman Pucinski
Brian Doherty
Mary O'Connor
Anthony Napolitano

North Side (Wards 42–50)

42nd Ward

This ward, historically covering most of the Near North Side, has recently moved slightly south to also encompass the northern part of the Loop.

43rd Ward

44th Ward
Thomas O. Wallace
Albert Loescher
John J. Grealis (Democratic)
Leo C. Burmeister Jr.
Thomas Rosenberg
William Singer
Dick Simpson
Bruce Young
John Merlo
Bernie Hansen
Tom Tunney

45th Ward
Leo M. Brieske
William Feigenbutz
Edwin F. Meyer (Democratic)
Theron W. Merryman
Charles J. Fleck
Charles H. Weber
Edwin P. Fifielski
Richard S. Clewis
Gerald McLaughlin
Patrick Levar
John Arena
Jim Gardiner

46th ward
Oscar F. Nelson (Republican)
James F. Young
Joseph R. Kerwin
Christopher B. Cohen
Ralph Axelrod
Jerome M. Orbach 
Helen Shiller
James Cappleman

47th Ward

48th Ward
Frank J. Link (Republican)
Francis L. Boutell (1925 – December 1, 1926, resigned to join the Cook County Board of Commissioners, Republican)
John A. Massen (Republican)
Robert C. Quirk
Allen A. Freeman 
Morris H. Hirsh
Robert J. O'Rourke
Marilou Hedlund 
Dennis H. Block 
Marion K. Volini
Kathy Osterman
Mary Ann Smith
Harry Osterman

49th Ward

50th Ward

Notes

References

Dates

Partisan affiliations

Ward maps

Bibliography